Weather Alive is the eighth studio album by English singer-songwriter Beth Orton. The album was released on 23 September 2022 by Partisan Records.

Background
Orton began work on Weather Alive after buying a used upright piano from a dealer at Camden Market in London for ₤300 ($350 USD) and creating songs by playing notes around the instrument. In an interview with The New York Times, Orton said of that creation process: "No matter where you touch [the piano], it just has these resonances [...] Little ghosts of other chords just keep ringing out and you're like, "Oh, that speaks of another melody, and that speaks of another feeling." In a press release following the album's announcement on 31 May 2022, Orton described the album as "a sensory exploration that allowed for a connection to a consciousness that I was searching for."

Singles
The album's title track was released as the first single on 31 May 2022. Reviewing for Pitchfork, Sam Sodomsky described Orton's vocal performance as "broken and determined, cresting in a chorus that flows with the emotional cadence of an old soul song."

Critical reception

Upon release, Weather Alive received acclaim from critics. At Metacritic, which assigns a normalised rating out of 100 based on reviews from mainstream publications, the album has a score of 85, based on twelve reviews, indicating "universal acclaim".

In the review for PopMatters, Evan Sawdey wrote that the album "unabashedly feels like the record [Orton] needed to make now, and we all feel more Alive because of it." Sam Sodomsky of Pitchfork called it "the best work" of Orton's career, describing it as "soothing, immersive, and self-produced, it conjures a dreamlike atmosphere with songs that spiral out into the ether". Reviewing the album for The Telegraph, Neil McCrommik stated that, "Orton digs so deeply into her own personal spaces and memories that what she finds there is unique. Middle-aged discontent has rarely sounded so lovely."

Describing the album in a review for AllMusic, Marcy Donelson declared that, "Weather Alive nestles into a comparatively hushed, atmospheric blend of acoustic and electronic timbres that's meticulous and nebulous at once." The reception for the album was more muted in a review for MusicOMH, where writer Ben Devlin claimed that some of the "arrangements can feel a little staid" but that overall they don't "keep Weather Alive from being an engrossing listen especially as Orton dominates the proceedings so expertly."

Track listing

Personnel
Credits for Weather Alive adapted from Tidal.
 Beth Orton – primary artist, composer, production, engineering
 Greg Calbi – mastering
 Craig Silvey – mixing
 Dani Bennett-Spragg – mixing engineering
 Fabio Senna – engineering
 Francine Perry – engineering
 Eliot Lee Hazel – creative director, artwork
 Aaron Mitchell – packaging design

Charts

References

2022 albums
Beth Orton albums
Partisan Records albums